John Willoughby is a character in Jane Austen's Sense and Sensibility

John Willoughby is also the name of:
John Willoughby, 9th Baron Willoughby of Parham (1643–1678), English peer of the House of Lords
John Willoughby, 8th Baron Willoughby of Parham (1669–1678), English peer of the House of Lords
Sir John Willoughby, 4th Baronet (1799–1866), British Member of Parliament for Leominster
Sir John Christopher Willoughby, 5th Baronet (1859–1918), Willoughby baronet, British army officer, Justice of the Peace
John Henry Charles Willoughby (1861–1940), Canadian physician and politician in Saskatchewan
John Willoughby (British Army officer) (1913–1991), British general

See also

Joan Willoughby, 7th Baroness Willoughby de Eresby